The House of Guicciardini is the name of an old and important Italian noble family, which originated from Florence. When Francesco Guicciardini married Princess Luisa Strozzi-Majorca-Renzi (1859–1933), this line of the family changed it's name to Guicciardini-Strozzi.

Notable members 
 Francesco Guicciardini (1483–1540), Italian historian and statesman
 Lodovico Guicciardini (1521–1589), his nephew, Italian historian active in Antwerp
 Francesco Guicciardini (1851–1915), Italian politician
 Niccolò Guicciardini (born 1957), Italian historian of mathematics

References